Sebastian Lang-Lessing (born 1966) is a German conductor.

Career 
Lang-Lessing received the Ferenc Fricsay Award at age 24.  He started his career at the Hamburg State Opera as an assistant conductor.  He subsequently became resident conductor at the Deutsche Oper Berlin. He was chief conductor of the Tasmanian Symphony Orchestra from 2004 to 2011.  He has served as chief conductor and artistic director of the Opera National de Lorraine.

Lang-Lessing has been music director of the San Antonio Symphony since 2010.  In March 2019, the orchestra announced that Lang-Lessing is to conclude his music directorship of the orchestra at the close of the 2019-2020 season.

Together with Niki Vasilakis and the Tasmanian Symphony Orchestra Lang-Lessing was nominated for the 2006 ARIA Award for Best Classical Album for the album Mendelssohn, Bruch, Ravel.

Awards and nominations

ARIA Music Awards
The ARIA Music Awards is an annual awards ceremony that recognises excellence, innovation, and achievement across all genres of Australian music. They commenced in 1987. 

! 
|-
| 2006 
| Mendelssohn, Bruch, Ravel (with Tasmanian Symphony Orchestra & Niki Vasilakis)
| Best Classical Album
| 
| 
|-

References

External links
 Official homepage of Sebastian Lang-Lessing
 Opus 3 Artists agency page on Sebastian Lang-Lessing

German male conductors (music)
Living people
1966 births
Texas classical music
Place of birth missing (living people)
21st-century German conductors (music)
21st-century German male musicians